The former First Church of Christ,  Scientist, located at 614-620 15th Street, East, in the residential neighborhood of Elliott Park, in Minneapolis, Minnesota, United States.
was the first Christian Science church building in Minnesota. It was once surrounded by Victorian homes, but most of them have been replaced by apartment buildings. Minneapolis architect S. J. Bowler designed the building in the Doric order. The facade of the building features a deep portico with two fluted columns holding up a pedimented gable.

National Register listing
First Church of Christ Scientist (added 1986 - Building - #86001340)
614–620 E. Fifteenth St., Minneapolis
Historic Significance: 	Event, Architecture/Engineering
Architect, builder, or engineer: 	Bowler, S.J.
Architectural Style: 	Beaux Arts, Renaissance
Area of Significance: 	Architecture, Religion
Period of Significance: 	1875-1899
Owner: 	Private
Historic Function: 	Religion
Historic Sub-function: 	Religious Structure
Current Function: 	Vacant/Not In Use

Current use
The building was used for several years as a laboratory performance space by the Margolis Brown Adaptors Company under the name 'Physical Theatre Lab'. It has been empty since 2001, and was being advertised for sale by a local real estate broker in 2007.

On January 28, 2012, the church was occupied temporarily by a group calling itself 'Minneapolis Space Liberation', as part of the larger Occupy movement. Approximately 50 people held the church for 45 minutes, during which time they had a dance party and food share. The action was conceived in solidarity with a building occupation in Oakland the same day, and to bring public attention to the many abandoned and neglected properties in the city.

The building was torn down, construction crews began the work in August 2022.

Later history of congregation
In 1914 First Church of Christ, Scientist, built its second edifice at 24th and Nicollet. Designed by noted Minneapolis architect Harry Wild Jones, this building is now the Minneapolis First Seventh-day Adventist Church.

See also
 List of former Christian Science churches, societies and buildings
 National Register of Historic Places listings in Hennepin County, Minnesota

References

1897 establishments in Minnesota
19th-century Christian Science church buildings
Beaux-Arts architecture in Minnesota
Churches completed in 1897
Churches in Minneapolis
Churches on the National Register of Historic Places in Minnesota
Former Christian Science churches, societies and buildings in Minnesota
National Register of Historic Places in Minneapolis